Yoko Ishiguro, known professionally as Yoko Blaqstone, is a Japanese singer, songwriter, record producer, lecturer, and the owner of Japanese independent record label Piza Studio. Based in Osaka, Japan, she has worked with a range of popular Japanese artists, including Mai Kuraki, Zard and Yumi Shizukusa. Ishiguro signed with Styling Records in 1997 and released her first extended play  's All Right (1997), which has sold approximately 15,000 copies nationwide.

Biography

1997–1999: Debut as a solo singer 
In 1997, Ishiguro signed with an independent record label Styling Records and released her first extended play  's All Right under the stage name Yoko Black. Stone. The extended play has sold more than 15,000 copies, attracting a big attention from the audience especially in Osaka, Japan.

In 1998, she released the lead single from her second extended play Long Fore-Play, "No Need 2 Worry". Ishiguro signed with a major label Giza Studio in 1999, and released "'s All Right" as the lead single from her first compilation album, The One About Me. The single peaked at number 74 on the Oricon Weekly Singles Chart.

In 1999, Japanese singer-songwriter Mai Kuraki covered Ishiguro's song "Baby I Like" and released it as her debut single in American market.

2000–2004: Fame as a songwriter 
After launching a career in Japan with "Love, Day After Tomorrow", Kuraki became one of the most successful singers in Japan in 2000's. Ishiguro wrote three songs for her debut album Delicious Way, which sold over 3,500,000 copies nationwide. After the success as a songwriter, Ishiguro started to launch the career as a songwriter for the artists including Zard, Yumi Shizukusa and Garnet Crow.

2005-present: Back to My Base and Piza Studio 
In 2005, Ishiguro released her first studio album Back to My Base under the name Yoko Blaqstone. This was her first release in six years, and remains as her last release as of June, 2020.

In 2014, she founded an independent record label Piza Studio and produced the debut extended play by Jam Flavor.

Discography

Albums

Studio albums

Compilation albums

Extended plays

Singles

Songwriting credits

References 

Living people
Japanese women singers
Musicians from Osaka Prefecture
Year of birth missing (living people)